The Communist Party of Castilla–La Mancha (in Spanish: Partido Comunista de Castilla–La Mancha), is the federation of the Communist Party of Spain (PCE) in Castilla–La Mancha.

External links
PCCM website

1921 establishments in Spain
Castilla-La Mancha
Political parties established in 1921
Political parties in Castilla–La Mancha